Samuel Deane Lowes (born 14 September 1990) is a British motorcycle racer competing in the Moto2 World Championship aboard a Kalex since 2019, and is part of the ELF Marc VDS Racing Team.

Lowes' 2022 season ended early, being unable to race in October at Malaysia and the final round in November at Valencia, Spain, due to the after-effects of a significant shoulder injury at the British GP practice in August 2022. 

Sam is the identical twin brother of World Superbike rider Alex Lowes.

Career
He won the Supersport World Championship 2013 riding a Yamaha YZF-R6 for Russian team Yakhnich Motorsport in the championship, as well as the 2010 British Supersport champion riding a Honda CBR600RR.

During his championship year in the British championship he scored five wins, including three consecutive wins and three pole positions, winning at Brands Hatch, Knockhill, Cadwell Park, Croft and Silverstone, along with five podium finishes. Afterward he moved to the Supersport World Championship full-time in 2011 signing for the Parkalgar Honda team. In his first complete year he scored six podiums, finishing 6th overall with 129 points. In 2012, he moved to Bogdanka PTR Honda, a sister team of the Parkalgar Honda, and earned two wins at the Donington Park and Aragón rounds. In 2013 he moved to Yakhnich Motorsport riding a semi-works Yamaha.

Lowes claimed the World Supersport championship in 2013 with one round remaining at Magny-Cours, finishing 2nd in the race. He was scheduled to race in the World Superbike Championship in 2014 with Yakhnich, however, these plans fell through as the team decided to jump to the championship without Yamaha.

Moto2 World Championship

Speed Up Racing (2014–2015)
Instead, he opted to join the Moto2 World Championship riding with the Speed Up team, signing a two-year deal with the team.

Federal Oil Gresini Moto2 (2016)
For 2016 onwards, Lowes signed a three-year contract backed by Aprilia, enabling him to continue in Moto2 for 2016 with the Gresini team and a change from Speed Up to Kalex chassis.

MotoGP World Championship
As well as this, Lowes had the added benefit of being Aprilia's official MotoGP test rider, but an anticipated move to compete for Aprilia in the premier MotoGP class for the 2017 and 2018 seasons was cut short by Aprilia exercising an early-release option announced half-way through the 2017 season, replacing him with Scott Redding for 2018.

Return to Moto2

Swiss Innovative Investors (2018)
Lowes returned to Moto2 for the 2018 season, riding a KTM bike for the Swiss Innovative Investors team, partnering Iker Lecuona. He replaced Thomas Lüthi, who moved up to MotoGP with the EG 0,0 Marc VDS team. Lowes finished 16th in the riders' championship, scoring 49 points, and he failed to score a single fastest lap, podium, win, or pole position for the first time since he made his Moto2 début in 2014.

Return to Federal Oil Gresini Moto2 (2019)
On 21 August 2018, it was announced that Lowes would rejoin Gresini Racing for the 2019 season, replacing Jorge Navarro who will move to Speed Up.

Marc VDS Racing Team (2020–present)
On 6 September 2019, it was announced Lowes would join Team Estrella Galicia 0,0 Marc VDS for 2020, where he would be partnering Alex Marquez.
Alex Marquez eventually moved up to the MotoGP class and was replaced by Augusto Fernández.

Lowes suffered a significant shoulder injury at the British GP practice in August 2022, and was unable to race in October at the season penultimate event in Malaysia. He and his team decided to withdraw at the Sepang racetrack, and seek further advice from surgeon Lennard Funk, based in Manchester, England. It was confirmed in early November that Lowes would not compete at the last event of the 2022 season in Valencia, Spain.

Career statistics

British Supersport Championship

Races by year
(key) (Races in bold indicate pole position, races in italics indicate fastest lap)

Supersport World Championship

Races by year
(key) (Races in bold indicate pole position, races in italics indicate fastest lap)

Grand Prix motorcycle racing

By season

By class

Races by year
(key) (Races in bold indicate pole position; races in italics indicate fastest lap)

References

External links

1990 births
Sportspeople from Lincoln, England
Living people
British identical twins
British motorcycle racers
English motorcycle racers
British Supersport Championship riders
Supersport World Championship riders
Twin sportspeople
English twins
Moto2 World Championship riders
Gresini Racing MotoGP riders
MotoGP World Championship riders